Varun Grover (born 26 January 1980) is an Indian writer, comedian, poet and filmmaker. He won the award for Best Lyricist at the 63rd National Film Awards in 2015. He is also the co-creator of Aisi Taisi Democracy, a political satire show. His debut feature All India Rank was the closing film at the 52nd IFFR.

Early life and education 
Grover was born in Sundernagar, HP, to a school-teacher mother and army engineer father. His family is Punjabi. He spent his initial years in Dehradun, Uttarakhand and Sundernagar, before moving to Lucknow for his adolescent years. He studied civil engineering at Indian Institute of Technology (BHU) Varanasi, graduating in 2003.

Collaboration in the Independent music space 
In 2017 Varun Grover released Beete Dino Ke Geet – a song in collaboration with US-based producer Krishna Chetan.

Filmography

Films

Television

Books
Paper Chor (2018), Jugnoo Prakashan 
Biksu (2019), Ektara India
Karejwa (2020), Bakarmaxindia

Awards and nominations 
 Won Best Lyrics award for "Moh Moh Ke Dhaage" (Dum Lagaa Ke Haisa) at 63rd National Film Awards 2015–16
 Won Best Lyricist award at Zee Cine Awards 2015
 Won Best Lyricist award at Guild Awards 2015
 Won Lyricist of The Year award at Mirchi Music Awards 2015 for "Moh Moh Ke Dhaage" from Dum Laga Ke Haisha
 Nominated for Best Lyricist at 61st Filmfare Awards 2016
 Nominated for Best Raaga-based song for Aayi Bahaar of Ankhon Dekhi at the Mirchi Music Awards 2014
 Nominated for Best Lyrics for Womaniya of Gangs of Wasseypur – Part 1 at the Apsara Film & Television Producers Guild Award 2013
 Awarded for Best Screenplay and Best Lyrics for song "Tu Kisi rail si" from movie Masaan at the Stardust Award 2015.
 Won Best Dialogue at 67th Filmfare Awards for Sandeep Aur Pinky Faraar 2022.

References 

1980 births
Living people
Punjabi people
Indian male comedians
Indian male screenwriters
People from Mandi district
Screenwriters from Himachal Pradesh
Indian television writers
21st-century Indian dramatists and playwrights
21st-century Indian male writers
Best Lyrics National Film Award winners
Male television writers
Novelists from Himachal Pradesh
21st-century Indian screenwriters